The women's 5000 metres at the 2016 European Athletics Championships took place at the Olympic Stadium on 9 July.

Records

Schedule

Results

Final

References

External links
 amsterdam2016.org, official championship site.

5000 W
5000 metres at the European Athletics Championships
2016 in women's athletics